The Parliamentary Under-Secretary of State for Northern Ireland was a role at the Northern Ireland Office of the Government of the United Kingdom. The role was also known as Under-Secretary of State, Northern Ireland. The position was created on 26 March 1972.

Responsibilities 
The Parliamentary Under Secretary of State leads on supporting the Secretary of State in his responsibilities, specifically:

Supporting the Secretary of State on legacy, New Decade, New Approach and Protocol.
Reviewing planning for future political negotiations and developing plans to help achieve greater levels of Integrated Education in Northern Ireland.
Leading the department’s work on Constitution and Rights such as abortion and ensuring women have access to services.
Responsible for legislation and engagement in the House of Lords.
Aiding political stability such as reviewing plans for the 25th Anniversary of the Good Friday Agreement.
Building substantive relationships across sectors and communities through engagement.

List of ministers

References 

Northern Ireland Office junior ministers
1972 establishments in the United Kingdom